Lucy Blanche Masterman (née Lyttelton; 19 July 188422 April 1977) was a British poet and diarist from the Lyttelton family. In 1908 she married the Liberal journalist Charles Masterman, who was later elected to parliament and briefly served as Chancellor of the Duchy of Lancaster. After his death, she stood for parliament unsuccessfully as a Liberal.

Early life
Born Lucy Blanche Lyttelton, the eldest daughter of General Sir Neville Lyttelton and his wife Katherine Sarah Stuart-Wortley, she joined the Fabian Society and in 1908 married Charles Masterman. They had one son,  Neville Masterman, who became a history lecturer at the University College of Swansea, and two daughters, including Margaret Masterman, a linguist.

Literary career
Masterman was the author of A Book of Wild Things (1910), Lyrical Poems (1912)
and Poems (1913). She worked as literary editor for Outlook and kept a diary while her husband was in government. In 1918, together with Elizabeth Lee, she published Wives of the Prime Ministers 1844-1906, and in 1939 followed this with C. F. G. Masterman: a biography. In 1930 she edited the papers of Mary Gladstone, published as Mary Gladstone (Mrs Drew): her diaries and letters. Her final publication was London from the Bus-top (1951).

Political career
At the 1929 General Election, two years after her husband’s death, Masterman was the Liberal candidate for the Conservative-held seat of Salisbury. The Liberals had last won the seat in 1923 and had come second in 1924. She finished a strong second, well ahead of Labour.

Masterman remained active for the Liberals in Salisbury and was again their candidate at the Salisbury by-election in March 1931, when she again finished second; after that, she continued as prospective Liberal candidate for Salisbury until being stood down in September 1931. In August of that year the Liberals and Conservatives had joined the new National Government, and the Salisbury Liberals agreed not to contest the seat. Masterman did not stand at an election again, but she remained politically active. In June 1936 she was elected to serve on the Liberal Party Council.

Election results

References

External links

Who's Who
Oxford Dictionary of National Biography
The Times Guide to the House of Commons 1929

1884 births
1977 deaths
British diarists
British women writers
Liberal Party (UK) parliamentary candidates
Lucy
Spouses of British politicians
Women diarists
Members of the Fabian Society